Sanjay Dobhal is an Indian politician and member of legislative assembly of Indian state of Uttarakhand. He represents Yamunotri Assembly constituency in Uttarkashi district.

Dobhal was elected as the member of Uttarakhand Legislative Assembly in 2022 Uttarakhand Legislative Assembly election. Dobhal defeated Deepak Bijalwan of Indian National Congress by 6639 votes.

References 

Living people
Uttarakhand MLAs 2022–2027
21st-century Indian politicians
People from Uttarkashi district

Year of birth missing (living people)